Almere Muziekwijk is a railway station in Almere, The Netherlands. It is located approximately 20 km east of Amsterdam. It is on the Weesp–Lelystad railway. The station was opened in 1987 when the line Weesp - Lelystad Centrum was built. In 1987 Almere Centrum and Almere Buiten stations opened before the Almere Buiten - Lelystad section was completed in 1988.

Almere has become a commuter city for Amsterdam. On 7 July 2008, there were 184,405 people living in Almere.

Train services
, the following train services call at this station:
Local Sprinter services Hoofddorp - Schiphol Airport - Amsterdam Zuid - Almere Oostvaarders
Local Sprinter services The Hague - Schiphol Airport - Amsterdam - Weesp - Almere - Lelystad - Zwolle
Local Sprinter services Utrecht - Hilversum - Almere

Bus services

4 - Almere Centrum - Muziekwijk - Literatuurwijk - Homerus - Almere Poort
7 - Sallandsekant - Tussen de Vaarten - Station Parkwijk - Filmwijk - Station Centrum - Muziekwijk Noord - Station Muziekwijk
14 - Almere Centrum - Muziekwijk - Literatuurwijk - Almere Poort
215 - Almere Buiten - Almere Stad - Muiden - Amstelveen - Schiphol Oost
N13 - Station Centrum → 't Oor → Haven → 't Oor → Gooisekant → Station Muziekwijk → Muziekwijk Noord → Station Centrum

External links
NS website 
Dutch Public Transport journey planner 

Muziekwijk
Railway stations opened in 1987
Railway stations on the Flevolijn